Race game may refer to:

 Race game, a category of board game
 See also, :Category:Race games, for more specific games
 Race Game (The Price Is Right), a pricing game from The Price is Right
 Racing video game